Charles Edgar "Bill" Milner (March 7, 1922 – December 25, 2006) was a professional American football player who played offensive lineman for three seasons for the Chicago Bears and New York Giants.

References

External links

1922 births
American football offensive linemen
Chicago Bears players
New York Giants players
Duke Blue Devils football players
South Carolina Gamecocks football players
2006 deaths
United States Marine Corps personnel of World War II
United States Marine Corps personnel of the Korean War
United States Marine Corps officers